Modiolus americanus, or the tulip mussel, is a species of bivalve mollusc in the family Mytilidae. It can be found along the Atlantic coast of North America, ranging from North Carolina to the West Indies.

References

americanus
Bivalves described in 1815